McDonough Center may refer to:

McDonough Gymnasium, at Georgetown University
McDonough Center for Leadership & Business, at Marietta College
Alma Grace McDonough Health and Recreation Center, at Wheeling Jesuit University